The 1932–33 Polska Liga Hokejowa season was the sixth season of the Polska Liga Hokejowa, the top level of ice hockey in Poland. Three teams participated in the final round, and Pogon Lwow and Legia Warszawa shared the championship, as they both finished with identical records.

Final Tournament

 Pogoń Lwów - AZS Poznań 2:0
 Legia Warszawa - AZS Poznań 2:1
 Legia Warszawa - Pogoń Lwów 0:0 OT

External links
 Season on hockeyarchives.info

Polska Hokej Liga seasons
Polska
1932–33 in Polish ice hockey